Page of Wands (or Jack or Knave of Wands or Batons) is a card used in Latin suited playing cards which include tarot decks. It is part of what tarot card readers call the Minor Arcana.

Tarot cards are used throughout much of Europe to play Tarot card games.

In English-speaking countries, where the games are largely unknown, Tarot cards came to be used primarily for divinatory purposes.

Divination usage
"The page lives where the wand, or the flame, is larger than the person. The drive is larger than life's experiences. The thirst for action and the yearning for progress has put you squarely in front of the task so that you can grow beyond your limit." (Evelin Burger)

Key Meanings
The key meanings of the Page of Wands:
Adventurous
Ambitious
Energetic and Active
New beginnings
Skilled

When comparing what you want to "move" and what is "moving" you, experiences become less important. That is the danger, and yet it is also a chance.  Don't "lose" yourself and don't lose your chance. When this card appears, it's time for a new beginning that will bring you to the point where you discover the true power and energy of your own fire, your personal power.  
  
Upon being born you were filled with drives, will power and desire. This is the perfect time to re-discover life, playfully conquering and greeting success and defeat, all events and experience with great enthusiasm.

This card is also considered the 'messenger' card.  When it is in a spread, it is highly likely that you will receive important news.

Symbolism 
 The wand that the page is holding has leaves sprouting from its tip, representing growth, change (from stick to leaves) and fertility.
 The figure is looking upwards, representing optimism and joy, drive.
 The desert around him is symbolic of the corresponding element fire and your own "fire". It is at the same time symbolic of the fact that you must not get lost, that you can't "lose" yourself.
 The Egyptian pyramids are represented in the background, symbolising exploration of far-off lands and new territories (from the mind of the European illustrator), either physically or metaphorically so.
 He is a young man, a page, showing that you must be playful and enthusiastic.
 He seems to be examining the wand, as if re-discovering it, showing us the need to re-discover our joy and playfulness.
 His clothes are adorned with salamanders, an agile animal which is representing the element of fire as it was thought to be able to walk through fire.

References

3. Evelin Burger and Johannes Fiebag (2006).  Tarot Basics, Sterling Publishing.

Suit of Wands